Melonguane is a town and district in Talaud Islands Regency in North Sulawesi province and it is the capital of the regency. Its population was 10,463 at the 2010 Census. The district was subsequently split in two, with a new East Melonguane district being created out of the eastern 38.5%. The areas and populations at the 2020 Census were as follows:

Climate
Melonguane has a tropical rainforest climate (Af) with heavy to rainfall year-round.

References

Populated places in North Sulawesi